Ode to Joy is the eleventh studio album from American indie rock band Wilco, released on October 4, 2019, on dBpm Records. The release has received positive reviews.

Recording and release
Wilco recorded the album in their Chicago studios in early 2019; on July 16, they announced the album, released lead single "Love Is Everywhere (Beware)", and announced tour dates. The live performances break a two and a half year hiatus for the band from touring and a year off in general. "Everyone Hides" was released as the album's second single on September 17, 2019. The album was recorded by taking simple song sketches from singer Jeff Tweedy, recording them in the studio with drummer Glenn Kotche, and then introducing the rest of the band to flesh out the musical ideas.

Critical reception

 Erin Osmon of Uncut praised the album, writing, "It's a protest record only this sextet could make, one that rings loudest in its simplicity. It favours subtle textures and hushed vocals, and further reveals its wisdom with each listen." Prior to its release, Paste named this one of the albums the writers were most excited about for October, citing the band's diversity and calling this release, "larger-than-life soft rock full of both grand ideas about the state of our world and small musings about matters of the heart". Reviewing the album for AllMusic Mark Deming claimed the band were, "more than willing to explore the boundaries of their music, and they do so with the confidence and sense of daring that has marked their best work from Being There onward." Michael Hann of The Guardian gave the release four out of five stars, praising the lyrics expressiveness and the different—if not quite experimental—use of varied instrumentation.
Nile Amos of Vinyl Chapters stated, "the album urges us, in the present world, to hunker down and appreciate loved ones and each other, more now than ever."

Track listing
All tracks written by Jeff Tweedy.
"Bright Leaves" – 4:10
"Before Us" – 3:22
"One and a Half Stars" – 3:44
"Quiet Amplifier" – 5:50
"Everyone Hides" – 3:00
"White Wooden Cross" – 3:12
"Citizens" – 3:03
"We Were Lucky" – 4:56
"Love Is Everywhere (Beware)" – 3:34
"Hold Me Anyway" – 4:00
"An Empty Corner" – 3:46

Personnel
Credits adapted from liner notes.

Wilco
Nels Cline – guitar
Mikael Jorgensen – keyboards
Glenn Kotche – drums, percussion
Pat Sansone – guitar, backing vocals
John Stirratt – bass guitar
Jeff Tweedy – vocals, guitar, production, package design

Additional personnel
Lawrence Azerrad – packaging design
Mark Greenberg – engineering assistance
Bob Ludwig – mastering
Zoran Orlic – photography
Tom Schick – engineering, mixing, production
Paul Von Mertens – saxophone

Charts

Weekly charts

Year-end charts

References

External links

2019 albums
Albums produced by Jeff Tweedy
DBpm Records albums
Wilco albums